Hyde Park ( / Hajd park) is a park in suburban Belgrade, Serbia. It is situated in the municipality of Savski Venac, on the northern slopes of Topčider Hill. It consists of two parts: woodland with tracks for running, and another with appliances for fitness and recreation. The park is triangular in shape. Hyde Park was laid out in the 1930s. 

Though called park, it is officially classified as an urban forest.

Nearby are Partizan Stadium, House of Flowers and Prokop station.

See also 
 Topčider

References

External links
 Hyde Park, Belgrade (in Serbian)
 Running tracks - Hyde Park (in Serbian)

Parks in Belgrade
Savski Venac